Ninja Boy, known in Japan as , is a 1990 action video game that was developed and published by Culture Brain for the Game Boy. It is the first game in the handheld series of Culture Brain's Super Chinese series. The game's hero is Jack, a ninja who wants to save a princess.

Gameplay
Ninja Boy uses the gameplay formula of Kung Fu Heroes. The player must fight through a number of enemies to unlock a door, which allows the player to advance to the next stage.

References

1990 video games
Game Boy-only games
Video games about ninja
Super Chinese
Game Boy games
Video games developed in Japan
Single-player video games